Miracles of Muhammad refers to the general accepted consensus miracles performed by Muhammed, the last Prophet of Islam, during his lifetime. These teachings stem from the text of the Quran (the central religious text of Islam), hadith (records of the words, actions, and silent approval, traditionally attributed to Muhammad), and biographies of him. Almost all  of these miracles come from the hadith as the vast majority are either not mentioned or what makes them miraculous is not mentioned in the Quran. 

Miracles attributed to Muhammad encompass a broad range, such as the multiplication of food, manifestation of water, hidden knowledge, prophecies, healing, punishment, and power over nature.
According to historian Denis Gril, the Quran does not overtly describe Muhammad performing miracles, and in several verses describes the Quran itself as Muhammad's miracle. However, several miracles are reported in the Quran and miracles "appear early and often in the hadith" and the hadiths are indispensable in elucidating Muhammad's miracles.

List of miracles
At least according to Kenneth L. Woodward and Abu Ibraheem, Muhammad is believed to have performed numerous miracles during his life.

Quran - The revelation of the Quran is considered by Muslims to be Muhammad's greatest miracle and a miracle for all times, unlike the miracles of other prophets, which were confined to being witnessed in their own lifetimes.
Scientific miracles: the theory of the scientific miracle of the Qur'an claims that the Qur'an has a miracle in expressing some scientific material (some modern scientific discoveries that were unknown at the time of writing the Qur'an). The history of writing in connection with the science and religion of Islam dates back to the works of Ibn Sina, Fakhr al-Razi, and Abu Hamid al-Ghazali, but has increased significantly in recent times. Authors in this field include Naeem Al-Mohassi, Maurice Bukay, Rafiei Mohammadi, Mostarhameh, Makarem Shirazi and Rezaei Isfahani. These interpretations state that some verses of the Qur'an reflect prophetic statements about the nature and structure of the universe, physics, fetal biological growth, biological evolution, geology, mountain structure, and other phenomena that have been later confirmed by scientific research. This group of Quran-commentators present this as a proof of the divinity of the Qur'an. 
Splitting of the Moon; While standing on the Mount Abu Qubays, Muhammad splits the moon into two parts 
Isra and Mi'raj (Night Journey); occurring in 621, in which Muhammad leads the prayers to previous prophets in the Al-Aqsa Mosque
 The events which occurred during his Hijrah (migration from Mecca to Medina):
The blindness of the Qurashite warriors who assembled at his door to assassinate him. He sprinkled a handful of dust at the assassins as he recited the 9th verse of Surah Ya Sin and went away without being seen by them.
It was then that Allah gave permission to Muhammad to migrate. - 
 He used to heal the sick and cure the blind by only touching the patient.
According to Ali ibn Sahl Rabban al-Tabari, Muhammad's success and victory against his enemies was one of his miracles. Similarly, many modern Muslim historians believe Muhammad's greatest miracles were his worldly accomplishments, in a short time span, in various fields (such as the religious, social, proselytising, political, military and literary spheres) and "the transformation of the Arabs from marauding bands of nomads into world conquerors."
 The day Muhammad came to Medina, everything there became illuminated, and the day he died, everything in Medina became dark.
When Muhammad and Abu Bakr migrated to Medina, Suraqa bin Malik pursued them. When they realized they were discovered, Muhammad looked at Suraqa so his horse sank into the earth.  Suraqa then begged Muhammad to rescue him, and Muhammad prayed to Allah for him; hence he was saved.
Prophecies made by him. This includes:
Muhammad telling his companion and Uthman, that a calamity would befall him, which would be followed with his entering paradise; this eventuated during Uthman's Caliphate.
He told his companion, Ammar ibn Yasir, that the unjust party would kill him; this eventuated during the First Fitna.
He prophesied to Suraqa bin Malik that he would wear the bracelets of Kosroe.
He said that Allah would make peace between two large Muslim groups through his grandson Hasan ibn Ali; this eventuated with the Hasan–Muawiya treaty.
He said that a man who was apparently fighting for the Muslim cause would actually be of the people of Hell; this was proven when the man committed suicide in order to remove his suffering following a wound in battle.
He said that he would kill one of the enemies of the Muslims, Ubay ibn Khalaf, which he achieved at the Battle of Uhud.
Before the Battle of Badr, he showed exactly where each of the enemy chiefs would be killed; they all died in the exact locations stated.
He said that his daughter Fatimah would be the first of his family to die after him; which eventuated.
On several occasions he provided food and water supernaturally.
He quenched the thirst of thousands of his soldiers during the Battle of Tabouk and enabled them to use water for ablution after causing water to pour forth.
He caused two trees to move at his command.
He caused a well to swell with water after he rinsed his mouth with some water and then threw it out into the well. This was during the event of the Treaty of Hudaybiyyah, enabling his followers with him to drink and use the water for ablution.
He threw a handful of dust at some of the enemy during the Battle of Hunain, causing them to be blinded. This miracle is mentioned in the Quran (Q8:17).
He caused Abdullah ibn Masud to convert to Islam after he made a barren ewe, which produced no milk, to produce milk.
He used his saliva to cure Ali's sick eye, during the Battle of Khaybar, and it became healthy.
His companions would hear the food before him praising Allah.
He caused it to rain during a drought in Medina.
 His prayers were instantly answered.
 Stones and trees used to greet him before and during his prophethood.
 He used to understand the language of animals.
He comforted a palm tree that was crying and upset after he stopped leaning on it during his sermons.
 He had The Seal of Prophethood (Khatam an-Nabiyyin) between his shoulders, specifically on the end of his left shoulder blade, It is depicted as a mole, in size compared to the egg of a partridge or to a pigeon's egg and its color was the same as that of Muhammad's body. It is believed that each prophet sent by Allah had this Seal on a certain part of his body.
It is reported, that Muhammad did not cast a shadow, interpreted as a sign of his "light".
 When Muhammad ascended Mount Uhud and he was accompanied by Abu Bakr, Umar and Uthman. The mountain shook beneath them. Muhammad then hit it with his foot and said, "O Uhud ! Be firm, for upon you there is none but a Prophet, a supporter of truth and two martyrs.
The same event occurred on Jabal al-Nour in Mecca.
 Muhammad used to hear the voices of persons who were being tortured in their graves.
 When Abu Jahl was going to trample Muhammad's neck or smear his face with dust as he was engaged in prayer, Abu Jahl came near him but turned upon his heels and tried to repulse something with his hands. It was said to him: What is the matter with you? He said: There is between me and him. A ditch of fire and terror and wings. Thereupon Muhammad said: If he were to come near me the angels would have torn him to pieces.
 He used to speak to the dead and hear them. It has also occurred with the bodies of the enemy chiefs after the Battle of Badr in the presence of his companions.
 He can fly and possesses the power of pyrokinesis, which can show him on fire.

Interpretations

Sunni Views
According to the consensus of Sunni scholars, rejecting a single letter of the Qur'an or a hadith which is mutawatir causes one to become a non-Muslim. Belief in the miracles of the prophet Muhammad in the Qur'an and in hadith which are transmitted by mutawatir are obligatory.

Other interpretations

Marcia Hermansen states "Miracles in the Islamic tradition play less of an evidentiary role than in some other religions since the prophet Muhammad's humanity is stressed."

See also
 Outline of Islam
 Glossary of Islam
 Index of Islam-related articles
 Quran and miracles
 Challenge of the Quran
 Islamic view of miracles
Magic and religion 
Miracles of Jesus
Miracles of Gautama Buddha
Occasionalism

References

Notes

Citations

Further reading

The Physical Miracles of Prophet Muhammad ﷺ Yaqeen Institute academic article